The Dymnoye peat railway is located in Kirov Oblast, Russia.

Current status 

Dymnoye peat railway emerged in the 1967s, in the area Verkhnekamsky District, in a settlement named Svetlopolyansk. The railway was built for hauling peat and workers and operates year-round with several pairs of trains a day. Peat is transshipped on broad gauge  rail line and taken to Kirov, Sharyu, to a combined heat and power (CHP).

Rolling stock

Locomotives 
TU4 – № 2790
TU6A – № 2172
TU6D – № 0319
ESU2A – № 715, 586, 1017
TU7 – № 1595, 3050, 1595, 1252

Railroad car
Flatcar
Tank car
Snowplow
Crane (railroad)
Tank car – fire train
Passenger car (rail)
Track laying cranes
Open wagon for peat
Hopper car to transport track ballast

Gallery

References and sources

See also
Narrow-gauge railways in Russia
Gorokhovskoye peat railway
Otvorskoye peat railway
Pishchalskoye peat railway

External links

  Official Website 
 The scheme of the railway 
 Photo - project «Steam Engine» 
 «The site of the railroad» S. Bolashenko 

750 mm gauge railways in Russia
Rail transport in Kirov Oblast
Verkhnekamsky District